Antonia Clara Iacobescu (born April 12 1989), known professionally as Antonia, is a Romanian singer.

Early life 
Antonia Clara Iacobescu was born on April 12, 1989, in Bucharest, but moved with family to the United States at the age of five. She spent her childhood in Utah, singing at the age of ten, and American culture strongly influenced her musical style. She finished high school in Las Vegas, Nevada and entered the modelling world.  She has participated in hundreds of photoshoots for catalogues and has collaborated with American agencies such as Lenz and Ford Models. In 2013, she also launched her clothing line called MOJA. At the age of 18, Antonia returned to Romania with her family.

Career 

In 2009 she met the Romanian producer Tom Boxer through a friend who had heard her singing. After the two met, Antonia and Tom created their first song known as "Roses on Fire". They also created a music video for the song, directed and filmed by Boxer.

In 2011, she released a single entitled "Pleacă" with the Vunk band. In mid-summer of 2012, Antonia released the promotional song "I got you" and the single "Jameia", the latter reaching 5th place in Romania.
After the birth of her first child, Antonia returned to music as a solo singer. She released "Marionette", written by the Dutch producer and Afrojack.

In 2014 she participated as a juror in the TV show Kids Sing, broadcast by Kanal D. On April 17, 2015, Antonia released her debut album This Is Antonia through the Romanian record label Roton. The album contains 12 tracks and is available in physical and digital format. In 2017 Antonia participated with Alex Velea as contestants in the show Look Who's Dancing on Pro TV. Also, in 2017 and 2018, she was on the jury of the television show The Four, broadcast by Antena 1.

Personal life
Antonia married Italian businessman Vincenzo Castellano in 2011, and they have a daughter together, Maya Rosario Castellano (born 2010). The two separated in 2013 and were in the process of divorcing, which ended in 2020.
In 2013, Antonia started a relationship with Romanian singer Alex Velea, with whom she has two children, Dominic (born 2014) and Akim (born 2016). The two announced their engagement in July 2021.

Discography

Albums

Singles

As lead artist

As featured artist

Promotional singles

Other singles

Guest appearances

Notes

References

External links

1989 births
21st-century Romanian singers
21st-century Romanian women singers
Musicians from Bucharest
Romanian dance musicians
Romanian electronic musicians
Romanian women pop singers
Romanian women singers
Global Records artists
English-language singers from Romania
Living people
Romanian emigrants to the United States
Models from Bucharest